Dan Lubin is a research physicist and senior lecturer at the Scripps Institute of Oceanography since 1990. He is a member of the American Geophysical Union, as well as Sigma Pi Sigma. He was a member of the National Ozone Expedition, and also participated in SHEBA. The general area of his research focuses on polar remote sensing and using global climate models to simulate climate change in the Arctic. In addition to a large number of scientific papers, he has written a textbook about the interactions between polar ice packs and the atmosphere. On October 17, 2012, Lubin gave a talk about solar activity and climate change at the SETI Institute.

Selected publications

References

University of Chicago alumni
American climatologists
Living people
Scripps Institution of Oceanography faculty
Place of birth missing (living people)
Year of birth missing (living people)